Slovenia participated in the Eurovision Song Contest 2013 with the song "Straight into Love" written by Hannah Mancini, Gregor Zemljič, Erik Margan, Matija Rodić and Marko Primužak. The song was performed by Hannah, who was internally selected by Slovenian broadcaster Radiotelevizija Slovenija (RTV Slovenija) to represent Slovenia at the 2013 contest in Malmö, Sweden. Hannah was announced at the Slovenian representative on 1 February 2013, while the song, "Straight into Love", was presented to the public on 14 February 2013.

Slovenia was drawn to compete in the first semi-final of the Eurovision Song Contest which took place on 14 May 2013. Performing during the show in position 3, "Straight into Love" was not announced among the top 10 entries of the first semi-final and therefore did not qualify to compete in the final. It was later revealed that Slovenia placed sixteenth (last) out of the 16 participating countries in the semi-final with 8 points.

Background 

Slovenia's highest placing in the contest, to this point, has been seventh place, which the nation achieved on two occasions: in 1995 with the song "Prisluhni mi" performed by Darja Švajger and in 2001 with the song "Energy" performed by Nuša Derenda. The country's only other top ten result was achieved in 1997 when Tanja Ribič performing "Zbudi se" placed tenth. Since the introduction of semi-finals to the format of the contest in 2004, Slovenia had thus far only managed to qualify to the final on two occasions. In 2012, "Verjamem" performed by Eva Boto failed to qualify to the final.

The Slovenian national broadcaster, Radiotelevizija Slovenija (RTV Slovenija), broadcasts the event within Slovenia and organises the selection process for the nation's entry. RTV Slovenija confirmed Slovenia's participation in the 2013 Eurovision Song Contest on 15 December 2012 after speculation that a withdrawal was being considered. The Slovenian entry for the Eurovision Song Contest has traditionally been selected through a national final entitled Evrovizijska Melodija (EMA), which has been produced with variable formats. For 2013, the broadcaster opted to forego the use of this national final in order to internally select the Slovenian entry due to time constraints and reduced funding.

Before Eurovision

Internal selection 
RTV Slovenija announced in January 2013 that the Slovenian entry for the Eurovision Song Contest 2013 would be selected internally in cooperation with Radio Val 202. On 1 February 2013, RTV Slovenija announced that they had selected Hannah Mancini to represent Slovenia in Malmö. The selection of Hannah as the Slovenian representative was made by an expert committee consisting of Aleksander Radić (Head of the Slovenian delegation at the Eurovision Song Contest), Andrej Hofer (representative of the RTV Slovenija entertainment department), Andrej Karoli (music editor for Radio Val 202), Blaz Tišler (music editor) and Mirko Stular (editor-in-chief for Radio Val 202).

The Slovenian song, "Straight into Love", was presented to the public during a press conference which took place on 14 February 2013 at the RTV Slovenija Studio 1 in Ljubljana. The song, written by Hannah herself together with Gregor Zemljič, Erik Margan, Matija Rodić and Marko Primužak, was selected by the expert committee from five songs received the broadcaster from directly invited composers.

Promotion 
Hannah's promotion for "Straight into Love" as the Slovenian Eurovision entry included a performance on 13 April during the Eurovision in Concert event which was held at the Melkweg venue in Amsterdam, Netherlands and hosted by Marlayne and Linda Wagenmakers.

At Eurovision
According to Eurovision rules, all nations with the exceptions of the host country and the "Big Five" (France, Germany, Italy, Spain and the United Kingdom) are required to qualify from one of two semi-finals in order to compete for the final; the top ten countries from each semi-final progress to the final. The European Broadcasting Union (EBU) split up the competing countries into six different pots based on voting patterns from previous contests, with countries with favourable voting histories put into the same pot. On 17 January 2013, a special allocation draw was held which placed each country into one of the two semi-finals, as well as which half of the show they would perform in. Slovenia was placed into the first semi-final, to be held on 14 May 2013, and was scheduled to perform in the first half of the show.

Once all the competing songs for the 2013 contest had been released, the running order for the semi-finals was decided by the shows' producers rather than through another draw, so that similar songs were not placed next to each other. Slovenia was set to perform in position 3, following the entry from Estonia and before the entry from Croatia.

In Slovenia, the semi-finals were televised on RTV SLO2 and the final was televised on RTV SLO1 with commentary by Andrej Hofer. The Slovenian spokesperson, who announced the Slovenian votes during the final, was Andrea F.

Semi-final 
Hannah took in technical rehearsals on 6 and 10 May, followed by dress rehearsals on 13 and 14 May. This included the jury final on 13 May where professional juries of each country, responsible for 50 percent of each country's vote, watched and voted on the competing entries.

The Slovenian performance featured Hannah performing choreographed movements, which included a run over the catwalk, in a black leather costume together with three dancers who also wore black outfits. The stage colours were predominantly white and blue. Hannah was joined by two on-stage backing vocalists: Linda Andrews and Susanne Ørum. The three dancers that joined Hannah on stage were Anže Škrube, Primož Pavlič and Matic Zadravec from the Maestro Dance Studio.

Despite high hopes from Slovenians, at the end of the show Slovenia was not announced among the top 10 entries in the second semi-final and therefore failed to qualify to compete in the final. It was later revealed that Slovenia placed sixteenth (last) in the semi-final, receiving a total of 8 points.

Voting 
Voting during the three shows involved each country awarding points from 1-8, 10 and 12 as determined by a combination of 50% national jury and 50% televoting. Each nation's jury consisted of five music industry professionals who are citizens of the country they represent. This jury judged each entry based on: vocal capacity; the stage performance; the song's composition and originality; and the overall impression by the act. In addition, no member of a national jury was permitted to be related in any way to any of the competing acts in such a way that they cannot vote impartially and independently. The members that comprised the Slovenian jury were: Dušan Hren (director), Urša Vlašič (lyricist, writer of the 1998, 2005, 2006 and 2011 Slovene contest entries), Darja Švajger (singer, vocal coach, represented Slovenia in the 1995 and 1999 contests), Raay (singer, producer) and Katja Koren (singer).

Below is a breakdown of points awarded to Slovenia and awarded by Slovenia in the first semi-final and grand final of the contest. The nation awarded its 12 points to Ukraine in the semi-final and to Denmark in the final of the contest.

Points awarded to Slovenia

Points awarded by Slovenia

References

2013
Countries in the Eurovision Song Contest 2013
Eurovision